Claudia Coulter is an actress, model and voice over artist of British/Latin descent who has appeared in a number of films and television programmes.

Education 
Coulter studied acting at the Academy of Live and Recorded Arts (A.L.R.A).

Career 
In 2006, Coulter made appearances in at least two BBC productions including an episode of Footballers' Wives and Jane Eyre.

In 2006 she also acted in a low budget vampire film titled The Witches Hammer.

In 2008 and early 2009, Coulter appeared in ITV's Trial and Retribution: Sirens.

Filmography
Re-Uniting the Rubins (2010)
Trial & Retribution XX: Siren (2009) (TV)
Jane Eyre (2006; Episode Three)
The Witches Hammer (2006)
Footballers' Wives (2006) (TV)
Rosemary & Thyme (2006) 
Coma Girl: The State of Grace (2005)
Headhunter: Redemption (2004) (Video game)
Almost Strangers (2004)
Frozen (2003)

References

External links
 
 Claudia Coulter official website

Year of birth missing (living people)
Living people
Alumni of the Academy of Live and Recorded Arts
British actors of Latin American descent
British female models
British people of Argentine descent